Lothar Bölck (born 27 January 1953) is a German cabarettist, writer and director.

Professional 

From May 2010 until it was discontinued in 2019, he and  ran the new MDR programme Kanzleramt Pforte D.

Awards 
with the :
 1999: 
 2000: 
 2001:  Leipzig 
 2003: 

as soloist:
 2006: 
 2006: , Melsungen
 2008:  
 2008:

References

External links 

Liveundlustig Kabarettportal Porträt zum 60. Geburtstag von Lothar Bölck

German cabaret performers
1953 births
Living people
People from Fürstenwalde